The 2013 Sylvania 300 was a NASCAR Sprint Cup Series stock car race held on September 22, 2013, at  New Hampshire Motor Speedway in Loudon, New Hampshire. Contested over 300 laps, it was the twenty-eighth in the 2013 NASCAR Sprint Cup Series, as well as the second race in the ten-race Chase for the Sprint Cup, which ends the season. Matt Kenseth of Joe Gibbs Racing won the race, his seventh of the season. Kyle Busch finished second. Greg Biffle, Jimmie Johnson, and Jamie McMurray rounded out the top five.

This race marks the final start for Scott Riggs.

Background

Results

Qualifying

1.  Josh Wise lost a shock absorber coming to the green flag and failed to complete a qualifying lap.

Race results

Notes

 Points include 3 Chase for the Sprint Cup points for winning, 1 point for leading a lap, and 1 point for most laps led.

Standings after the race

Note: Only the first thirteen positions are included for the driver standings.

References

Sylvania 300
Sylvania 300
Sylvania 300
NASCAR races at New Hampshire Motor Speedway